WNVY (1070 AM) is a radio station broadcasting a Christian radio format. Licensed to Cantonment, Florida, United States, the station serves the Pensacola area. The station is currently owned by Pensacola Radio Corporation.

History
The station was assigned the call letters WJBW on 1991-08-19. On 1993-04-21, the station changed its call sign to WKGT then on 1994-01-31 to the current WNVY.
Played nostalgia and easy listening in 1993–1994, and home of the "Toast of the Coast" morning show.

References

External links

Radio stations established in 1991
NVY
1991 establishments in Florida